Robert Chauncey Frazee (September 1, 1928 – January 24, 2009) was an American businessman and politician.

Born in San Luis Rey, California, Frazee graduated from Oceanside High School.

Career 
Frazee served in the United States Marines Corp during the Korea War and was a radio technician. Frazee owned Frazee Flowers in Carlsbad, California. He served on the Carlsbad City Council from 1972 to 1974 and then served as mayor of Carlsbad from 1972 to 1978. Frazee was a Republican.

On November 7, 1978, Frazee won the election and became a Republican member of California State Assembly for District 76. Frazee defeated Austin Childs with 67.15% of the votes.

Frazee served in the California State Assembly from 1979 to 1994.

Personal life 
Frazee's wife is Dolores Hedrick. They have two children. On January 24, 2009, Frazee died suddenly of a heart attack near Bora Bora, French Polynesia while on a cruise in the South Pacific.

References

External links
Join California Robert C. Frazee

1928 births
2009 deaths
People from Carlsbad, California
Businesspeople from California
Mayors of places in California
California city council members
Republican Party members of the California State Assembly
20th-century American politicians
20th-century American businesspeople
United States Marine Corps personnel of the Korean War